Baranov is a Russian surname.

Baranov or Baranof may also refer to:

Places
Baranof Island
Baranof Lake
Baranof River
Baranof Warm Springs, Alaska
Baranof Cross-Island Trail
Cape Baranov, Severnaya Zemlya
Castle Hill (Sitka, Alaska) (Baranof Castle Hill State Historic Site), Sitka, Alaska

Other uses
Baranov Central Institute of Aviation Motors development

See also
Baranow (disambiguation)